Abū Bakr Aḥmad ibn Ḥusayn ibn ʿAlī ibn Mūsā al-Khusrawjirdī al-Bayhaqī (994–1066), also known as Imām al-Bayhaqī, was a Persian Sunni polymath widely known for being the foremost leading hadith master in his age, leading fuquha of the Shafi'i school, leading authority on the foundation of doctrine, meticulous, a devoted ascetic and known as one of the proponent defenders of the Ash'ari school. Al-Dhahabi said: "Unequalled in his age, unrivalled amongst his peers, and the Ḥāfiẓ of his time."

Biography

Birth
Al-Bayhaqi was born c. 994 CE/384 AH in the small town of Khosrowjerd near Sabzevar, then known as Bayhaq, in Khurasan.

Education
Al-Bayhaqi was a scholar of fiqh of the Shafi'i school of thought, as well as of that of hadith. He studied fiqh under two prominent jurists, Abū al-Fatḥ Nāṣir ibn al-Ḥusayn ibn Muḥammad al-Naysaburi as well as Abul Hasan Hankari. He also studied hadith under Hakim al-Nishaburi (foremost leading hadith scholar at his time) and was al-Nishaburi's foremost pupil. Al-Bayhaqi belongs to the third generation of Ash'ari school and took kalam from two leading theologians of their time Ibn Furak and Abu Mansur al-Baghdadi.

Asceticism
Al-Bayhaqi was known for his extreme piety and was a frugal spender in the same manner of the pious scholars. He constantly fasted for thirty years straight before his death except the days of Eid and Tashriq which are prohibited to fast. It is known that perpetual fast (Sawm al-Dahr) is a famous practise done by several companions and the Salaf such as Umar, Uthman, Ibn Shihab al-Zuhri, Abu Hanifa, Al-Shafi'i, Al-Tustari, and etc.

Imam al-Nawawi explains this topic: "Ibn Umar fasted permanently, i.e. except the days of Eid and Tashriq. This perpetual fast is his way and the way of his father Umar Ibn al-Khattab, Aisha, Abu Talha and others of the Salaf as well Al-Shafi'i and other scholars. This position is that perpetual fasting is not disliked (makruh).

Creed
One focus of Al-Bayhaqi's was prophetic traditions which implied an anthropomorphic understanding of God. For Al-Bayhaqi, these characteristics, such as the "eye", do not represent real parts but rather attributes of God.

Ibn al-Subki narrates that Al-Bayhaqi deemed the prophet's mention to Abu Musa al-Ash'aris people to include Abu Hasan al-Ash'ari and his school. Al Bayhaqi said:

The prophet pointed to Abu Musa al-Ash'ari in relation to the verse: (Allah will bring a people whom HE loves and who love him) (5:54) saying: "They are that man's people," due to the tremendous merit and noble rank attributed by this hadith to the Imam Abu al-Hassan al-Ash'ari. For he is part of Abu Musa's people and one of his children who received knowledge and were granted discernment, and he was singled out for strengthening the Sunna and repressing innovation by producing clear proofs and dispelling doubts. It is most likely that the prophet named Abu Musa's people a people believed by Allah because he knew the soundness of their religion and the strength of their belief. Therefore, whoever leans towards them in science of foundation of Religion and follows their position in disowning tashbih (likening Allah with his creation) while adhering to the Qu'ran and the Sunna, is one of their people.

Views
Al-Bayhaqi also had a variety of views stating his understanding of cosmology. Al-Bayhaqi believed that God first created water, and subsequently used this water as a basis for his creation of everything else.

Death
He died in Nishapur on the 9th April 1066 at the age of 74.

Legacy
Al-Bayhaqi contributed to a significant reform in the traditionalist evaluation of hadith, emphasizing the use of reflective reasoning in evaluating which hadith material should be considered incompatible with Islamic theology. Often, Al-Bayhaqi would then understand such hadith as less reliable or allegorical. 

Imam Al-Bayhaqi is regarded as the last person in history to comprehensively collect and assemble the textual evidence of the Shafi'i madhab including the hadith, the opinions of Imam Shafi'i and those of his direct students. Imam al-Haramayn Al-Juwayni said: "There is no Shafi'i except he owes a huge debt to Al-Shafi'i except Al-Bayhaqi, to whom Al-Shafi'i owes a huge debt for his (Bayhaqi's) works which imposed Al-Shafi'i's school and his sayings (enforced and strengthened)." Al-Dhahabi comments: "Abu Al-Ma'ali (Ibn Al-Juwayni) is right! It is as he said, and if Al-Bayhaqi had wanted to found a school of Law (madhab) for himself he would have been able to do so, due to the vastness of his sciences and his thorough knowledge of juridical differences (legal matters)."

Imam Ibn Subki states: "He was the Imam Bayhaqi: one of the Imams of the Muslims, guides of the believers, and callers to the firm rope of Allah. He was a sublime jurist (faqih jalil), an eminent (kabir) hafiz; an adept jurisprudent (usulu nihrir); abstinent; godly; obedient to Allah (qanit li'llah); firm in supporting the Shafi'i legal school, in terms of methodology (aslan) and derivation of law (fur'ian); and a mountain from the mountains of knowledge...He was the muhaddith of his time (zaman) Shaykh of the Sunnah in his era (waqt).

The use of Sahih al-Bukhari and Sahih Muslim as authentic books was first introduced by Al-Bayhaqi. Al-Bayhaqi's three major works (massive hadith collections) marked the end of the original hadith collections.

Works
Bayhaqi was a prominent author in his time, having authored more than one thousand volumes according to Al-Dhahabi. Among the most well-known books authored by him are:
 Sunan al-Kubra ("The Major Book of the Prophet's Sunnnas"), commonly known as Sunan al-Bayhaqi
 Shuab ul Iman ("The Branches of Faith"),
 Sunan al-Wusta, also referred to as [Ma`arifa al-Sunan wa al-Athar] ("The Knowledge of Sunnas and Reports")
 al-I'tiqad wa'l-Hidayah ila Sabil ar-Rashad (translated by Nasr Abdussalam, The Creed of Imam Bayhaqi, 2017)
 Bayan Khata Man Akhta`a `Ala al-Shafi`i ("The  Exposition of the Error of Those who have Attributed Error to al-Shafi`i")
 Al-Mabsut ("The Expanded"), a book on Shafi`i Law.
 Al-Asma' wa al-Sifat ("The Divine Names and Attributes"), 
 Al-I`tiqad `ala Madhhab al-Salaf Ahl al-Sunna wa al-Jama`a ("Islamic Doctrine According to the School of the Predecessors Which is the School of the People of the Prophet way and Congregation of His companions.")
 Dala'il al-Nubuwwah ("The Signs of Prophethood")
 Al-Da`awat al-Kabir ("The Major Book of Supplications")
 Al-Zuhd al-Kabir ("The Major Book of Asceticism")
 Hayat ul Anbiya fi Quboor ("The life of the prophets in graves")
 Al-Arba'um al-Sughra ("The Minor Collection of Forty Hadiths"
 Al-Khilafiyyat ("The Divergences")
 Fada'il al-Awqat ("Times of Particular Merit" [for worship])
 Manaqib al-Shafi'i ("The Immense Merits of Al-Shafi'i")
 Manaqib al-Imam Ahmad ("The Immense merits of Imam Ahmad")
 Tarikh Hukama 'al-Islam ("History of the Rulers of Islam")

See also 
 List of Ash'aris and Maturidis

References

Bibliography

 

990s births
1066 deaths
Persian Sunni Muslim scholars of Islam
Shafi'is
Asharis
Hadith compilers
Hadith scholars
Muhaddiths from Nishapur
11th-century jurists
Biographical evaluation scholars
Sunni imams
11th-century Muslim theologians